Johann Jacob Baier (14 June 1677– 14 July 1735) was a German physician and naturalist who wrote on the geology and fossils of the Nuremberg area in his book Oryctographia Norica. He considered the Deluge of the Bible to be the only catastrophe to have occurred in earth history.

Baier was born in Jena, the son of theologian Johann Wilhelm Baier and Anna Katharine Musaeus. He was educated at Jena then received a degree in medicine from Halle after which he became a professor at Altdorf, Switzerland from 1704. He became a personal physician to the Emperor in 1731. Baier was elected to the Leopoldina Academy over which he presided from 1731. Apart from his collections of fossils, he also collected portraits of learned people, with a collection of nearly 600 of them. Baier also published a biographical account of the medical faculty at Altdorf. His son Ferdinand Jacob Baier (1707-1788) was also a physician and naturalist.

His specimens are distributed in collections. A specimen of the ammonite Phylloceras heterophyllum was purchased by the Jena museum in 1728.

References

External links 
 Oryktographia norica (1708)
 Sciagraphia Musei Sui (1730)

German paleontologists
German naturalists
1677 births
1735 deaths
Physicians from Jena
Scientists from Jena